Noel Broxholme, M.D. (1686–1748), was an English physician.

Early life
Broxholme was, according to Dr. Stukeley, a native of Stamford, Lincolnshire, of humble origin. He was admitted on the foundation at Westminster School in 1700, and in 1704 was elected to Trinity College, Cambridge. He proceeded, however, to Christ Church, Oxford, where he was nominated student 23 July 1705, and graduated B.A. 20 May 1709, M.A. 18 April 1711. In the former year, 1709, he had commenced his medical studies, under Richard Mead, at St. Thomas's Hospital, and in 1715 was elected to one of the first of the Radcliffe travelling fellowships. Upon his return he removed to University College, Oxford, as a member of which he took his degrees in physic by accumulation, proceeding M.D. 8 July 1723.

Medical career
Broxholme then began practice in London, was admitted a candidate of the College of Physicians 23 December 1723, a fellow 22 March 1724–5, was censor in 1726, and delivered the Harveian oration in 1731. This, which was printed the same year in quarto, is remarkable for its elegant yet unaffected Lafinity.

He was one of the six physicians appointed to St. George's Hospital at the first general board held 19 Oct. 1733, and in the following year was made first physician to the Prince of Wales, 'with salary annexed,' an office which he resigned in 1739. At Lord Hervey's suggestion he was the first physician summoned to assist Dr. Tessier in Queen Caroline's last illness.

Private life
He died at his country residence, Hampton, Middlesex, by his own hand, 8 July 1748, and was buried on the 13th at Hampton. By his will he bequeathed the sum of £500 for the benefit of the king's scholars at Westminster 'in such manner as the two upper masters of the said school shall think fit,' and a like sum to Christ Church 'to be applied towards finishing the library.'

He had married 7 May 1730, at Knightsbridge Chapel, Amy, widow of William Dowdeswell of Pull Court, Worcestershire, and daughter of Anthony Hammond. Mrs. Broxholme survived her husband six years, dying in 1754.

Legacy
Reverting to our former authority, Dr. Stukeley, his countryman and fellow-student at St. Thomas's Hospital, we learn that Broxholme 'was a man of wit and gayety, lov'd poetry, was a good classic, … got much money in the Misisipi project in France. At length he came over and practised, but never had a great liking to it, tho' he had good encouragemt.' He was always nervous and vapoured,' writes Horace Walpole, 'and so good-natured that he left off his practice from not being able to bear seeing so many melancholy objects. I remember him with as much wit as ever I knew.'

In 1754 there appeared 'A Collection of Receipts in Physic, being the Practice of the late eminent Dr. Bloxam [sic]: containing a Complete Body of Prescriptions answering to every Disease, with some in Surgery. The Second Edition.' 8vo, London.

References

1686 births
1748 deaths
18th-century English medical doctors
17th-century English writers
17th-century English male writers
18th-century English people
People from Stamford, Lincolnshire
People educated at Westminster School, London
Alumni of Trinity College, Cambridge
Alumni of Christ Church, Oxford
Alumni of University College, Oxford
Fellows of the Royal College of Physicians
English medical writers
18th-century English non-fiction writers
18th-century English male writers
18th-century English writers